Acentrogobius cyanomos, or the threadfin blue goby is an amphidromous benthopelagic species of goby found in brackish and salt water in Bangladesh, India, Indonesia, Malaysia, and Thailand.

References

cyanomos
Fish of Thailand
Taxa named by Pieter Bleeker
Fish described in 1849